Ayer's Cliff Fair is the common name for the Annual Exhibition of the Stanstead County Agricultural Society.

The first meeting of the Stanstead County Agricultural Society took place in 1845. Its main purpose was for farmers in the region to get together and exchange ideas on farming.  Residents of this county would enter their farm animals and crops for competition. Women would exhibit their cooking and hand-crafted work. From 1845 to 1872, the exhibitions were held at various locations in the county, but in 1872, Ayer's Cliff, Quebec became its permanent home.

The first three-day fair was held in 1913.  At that time, horse races were one of the attractions.  Today, the Ayer's Cliff Fair has maintained the original events, but has added various attractions such as: a midway (rides), musical shows, and many arcade games with prizes.

External links 
 Stanstead County Exposition

See also 
 Ayer's Cliff
 Janet Blake

Agricultural fairs in Canada